Tunebo may refer to:
U'wa people, formerly known as Tunebo, who live in northeastern Colombia
Uw Cuwa, their language